Agana Shopping Center is a shopping center located in downtown Hagåtña, in the United States territory of Guam. Opening in 1978, the mall is one of numerous malls on Guam. Main competitors include Micronesia Mall, Guam's largest shopping mall and Guam Premier Outlets in Tamuning.

The mall includes five  theatres called Agana Center Stadium Theatres because of its true stadium seating capacity. The mall also includes a Sky Zone trampoline park.

The shopping center was severely damaged when a typhoon struck the island in 2002.  Agana Shopping Center also features recognized home-grown businesses such as Shirley's Coffee Shop.

Notable chain restaurants include Pizza Hut, Taco Bell, Panda Express, Subway, Wendy’s, Pretzelmaker, Cinnabon, Chatime, Tony Roma's, Froots, and Capricciosa, a Japanese-owned Italian restaurant chain. There are also local restaurants in the mall such as Dr.Kabob, Fizz & Co, Shirley’s Coffee Shop, Sushi Rock, Poke Seven, Snowberry, and a Japanese restaurant.

Stores in the mall include GameStop, Vitamin World, SM Island, Memories of Guam, Docomo Pacific, GTA, A-One Shoe Store, IT&E, Jeans Warehouse, and more.

References

External links

Information on Agana Shopping Center

Shopping malls in Guam
Shopping malls established in 1978
1978 establishments in Guam